Assault on Salamaua is a 1943 Australian documentary film, produced by Cinesound Productions, about the Salamaua–Lae campaign during World War II.

It features an introduction by Damien Parer, who shot most of the footage.

This documentary features the iconic shot of a wounded, blinded soldier being assisted across a stream.

References

External links
Assault on Salamau at Oz Movies
28 minutes of Parer footage cut down to make the film at Australian War Memorial
Full copy of film at YouTube

Australian World War II propaganda films
Australian documentary films
1943 documentary films
1943 films
Australian black-and-white films
1940s Australian films